B28, B 28 or B-28 may refer to:

 B28 expressway (Croatia), a road in central Croatia
 North American B-28 Dragon, a proposed World War II medium bomber
 B-28 (grape), another name for the Swiss wine grape Garanoir
 B28 nuclear bomb
 Bundesstraße 28, a German road
 Band 28 (700 MHz), a band used by public mobile phone operators